Paramecocnemis is a genus of white-legged damselfly in the family Platycnemididae. There are about five described species in Paramecocnemis.

Species
These five species belong to the genus Paramecocnemis:
 Paramecocnemis eos Orr, Kalkman & Richards, 2012
 Paramecocnemis erythrostigma Lieftinck, 1932
 Paramecocnemis similis Orr, Kalkman & Richards, 2012
 Paramecocnemis spinosa Orr, Kalkman & Richards, 2012
 Paramecocnemis stillacruoris Lieftinck, 1956

References

Further reading

 
 
 

Platycnemididae
Articles created by Qbugbot